Victoria de Stefano (21 June 1940 – 6 January 2023) was an Italo-Venezuelan novelist, essayist, philosopher and educator.

Early life and education 
Victoria de Stefano was born in Rimini, Italy in 1940, and moved to Venezuela with her family in 1946. She recounts this experience in Su vida, a collection of autobiographical texts published in 2019.

De Stefano studied at the Instituto Politécnico Educacional. She graduated with a degree in Philosophy from Universidad Central de Venezuela (UCV) in 1962.

Exile 
De Stefano, her husband Pedro Duno and their two sons went into exile at the end of 1962. They lived in Havana, Cuba; Algeria; Switzerland; Paris, France; and Sitges, Spain.

Return to Venezuela 
De Stefano and her family returned to Caracas in 1966. There she worked as a researcher at the Institute of Philosophy at the Universidad Central de Venezuela, and taught Aesthetics, Contemporary Philosophy, and Art Theory at the School of Philosophy and School of Art of the Universidad Central de Venezuela.

Personal life and death 
De Stefano was married to the philosopher Pedro Duno, with whom she had two sons: Rodrigo Duno and Martín Duno. De Stefano and Duno later separated.

De Stefano died in Caracas on 6 January 2023, at the age of 82.

Publications 
De Stefano's works include:

 El desolvido (1971),
 Sartre y el marxismo (1975)
 La noche llama la noche (1985),
 Poesía y Modernidad, Baudelaire (1984)
 El lugar del escritor (1990)
 Cabo de vida (1993)
 Historias de la marcha a pie (1997)
 Lluvia (Barcelona: Candaya, 2002)
 Paleografías (2010)
 Historias de la marcha a pie (Reed. 2013)
 Su vida (El Taller Blanco Ediciones, Bogotá. 2019 )
 Venimos, vamos (Planeta, 2019)

Prizes 
De Stefano won the following prizes:

 Premio Municipal de Ensayo (1984)
 Finalist in the Premio Internacional de Novela Rómulo Gallegos (1999)
 Premio Municipal de Novela (2006).

References 

1940 births
2023 deaths
Venezuelan women writers
Venezuelan novelists
Venezuelan essayists
Italian emigrants to Venezuela
People from Rimini